Christy Louise Grimshaw (born 8 November 1995) is a Scottish professional footballer who plays as a midfielder for Serie A club AC Milan and the Scotland national team.

Early life
Grimshaw was born in Kirkcaldy but raised in Stonehaven, where she was educated at Mackie Academy.

Club career
After starting her club career at Deeside, Grimshaw moved to the local Scottish Women's Premier League club Aberdeen Ladies and played in their first team at 17 years old. In 2014 she began studying at Barry University in Miami and playing college soccer for the "Barry Buccaneers" under Scottish coach Denise Brolly. In a five-year stint (she redshirted in 2016) she played 65 games and scored 31 goals.

After her graduation Grimshaw rejected offers from English FA WSL teams Bristol City and Brighton to sign for FC Metz of the French Division 1 Féminine. She started seven of her 13 league appearances for Metz, scoring one goal, as the club finished bottom of the 2019–20 Division 1 Féminine table and were relegated.

In July 2020, Grimshaw signed for Italian Serie A club Milan, a scenario which she described as: "like a football fairy tale". Milan finished as runners-up in both the league and Coppa Italia, but Grimshaw was happy with life at the club and her coach Maurizio Ganz. She signed a contract extension in May 2021.

International career
Interim coach Stuart McLaren called up Grimshaw for her debut in the Scotland women's national football team in June 2021, for a 10-day training camp which included friendly matches against Northern Ireland and Wales.

She won her debut cap in her first game, appearing as a 90th-minute substitute for Claire Emslie in Scotland's 1–0 win over Northern Ireland at Seaview in Belfast. She scored her first goal for Scotland in a 7–1 2023 FIFA Women's World Cup qualification win over the Faroe Islands at Hampden Park on 21 September 2021.

Career statistics

International

Scores and results list Scotland's goal tally first, score column indicates score after each Grimshaw goal.

References

External links
 
 

1995 births
Living people
Scottish women's footballers
Scotland women's international footballers
Scottish Women's Premier League players
Women's association football midfielders
Barry Buccaneers women's soccer players
FC Metz (women) players
Scottish expatriate women's footballers
Scottish expatriate sportspeople in France
Expatriate women's footballers in France
Expatriate women's footballers in Italy
Scottish expatriate sportspeople in Italy
Scottish expatriate sportspeople in the United States
A.C. Milan Women players
Serie A (women's football) players
People from Stonehaven
Footballers from Aberdeenshire
Aberdeen F.C. Women players